USS Farragut may refer to the following ships of the United States Navy:

 , a torpedo boat, commissioned on 5 June 1899
  was a  commissioned on 4 June 1920
 , the lead ship of her class of destroyers, was commissioned on 18 June 1934
 , again the lead ship of her class of destroyers, was commissioned on 10 December 1960
  is a Flight IIa Arleigh Burke-class guided missile destroyer, commissioned on 10 June 2006

United States Navy ship names
USS